Andrew Jones (born 24 June 1980) is an Australian racing driver who previously competed in the Supercars Championship and Dunlop Super2 Series, driving with family-owned team Brad Jones Racing for majority of his career.

Jones has had success in a number of forms of motorsport in Australia. In 2004 he won the Konica Minolta V8 Supercar Series, the second tier series, and went on to secure a drive with Garry Rogers Motorsport in the 2005 V8 Supercar Championship Series. In 2006, he joined Tasman Motorsport, replacing Jamie Whincup but had a frustrating and disappointing year. It was announced that he was moving back to Albury to re-join his uncle Brad and father Kim's team, Brad Jones Racing, replacing John Bowe at the start of the 2007 season. His cousin Macauley Jones also races.

Career results

Complete Development Series results

(key) (Races in bold indicate pole position) (Races in italics indicate fastest lap)

Complete Bathurst 1000 results

External links 
 Official Andrew Jones web site
 Andrew's Blog
 Team BOC Official Site

1980 births
Formula Ford drivers
Living people
Sportspeople from Albury
Racing drivers from New South Wales
Supercars Championship drivers
Garry Rogers Motorsport drivers